Gentiana punctata, the spotted gentian, is a least concern herbaceous species of flowering plant in the Gentian family Gentianaceae. It grows in Central and Southeastern Europe at altitudes 1.500−2.600 meters. It is 20−60 cm tall.

References

External links
 Kvetiny.atlasrostlin.cz

punctata
Taxa named by Carl Linnaeus